Høy is a Danish and Norwegian surname. Notable people with the surname include:

 Alfred Høy (1885–1970), Norwegian engineer
 Andreas Høy (born 1817), Norwegian politician
 Iver Høy (1877–1943), Norwegian businessman
 Jytte Høy , Danish artist

Norwegian-language surnames
Danish-language surnames